Peony is a novel by Pearl S. Buck first published in 1948. It is a story of China's Kaifeng Jews.

Plot
Peony is set in the 1850s in the city of Kaifeng, in the province of Henan, which was historically a center for Chinese Jews. The novel follows Peony, a Chinese bondmaid of the prominent Jewish family of Ezra ben Israel's, and shows through her eyes how the Jewish community was regarded in Kaifeng at a time when most of the Jews had come to think of themselves as Chinese. The novel contains a hidden love and shows the importance of duty, along with the challenges of life. This novel follows the guidelines of Buck's work: it is set in China, and it involves religion and an interracial couple (David and Kueilan).

Preface
A prefatory note preceding the title page, which tells the reader of the assimilation about the Jews of Kaifeng, reads: "Today even the memory of their origin is gone. They are Chinese."

References

See also

1948 American novels
American historical novels
Novels by Pearl S. Buck
Novels set in the Qing dynasty
Jews and Judaism in Kaifeng
Kaifeng in fiction
Jews and Judaism in fiction
Novels set in the 1850s
John Day Company books